"Welcome to Storybrooke" is the 17th episode of the second season of the American ABC fantasy/drama television series Once Upon a Time, and the show's 39th episode overall. It aired on March 17, 2013.

It was co-written by Ian Goldberg and Andrew Chambliss, and was directed by David M. Barrett.

This episode centers around Regina as she tries to get revenge on Mary Margaret, while flashbacks show Regina's past with Greg Mendell.

Plot

In the Characters' Past
In 1983, Kurt Flynn and his young son Owen are camping in the Maine woods when they stumble upon Storybrooke. Regina invites Kurt and Owen to dine at her home and invites them to relocate to Storybrooke. The next day, Regina learns the Flynns are leaving. She uses Graham's heart to order him to arrest Kurt and abduct Owen for her. Kurt orders Owen to run as far as he can, which he does while Graham arrests Kurt. Owen returns with police officers, but Storybrooke is no longer evident. Owen vows never to stop looking for his father, while Regina weeps as she reaches out to him from inside Storybrooke.

In Storybrooke
As Regina prepares to bury Cora, Gold comes to pay his respects.  Regina intends to kill Snow White, but Gold points out that would cost her Henry.

Emma reveals that Mary Margaret had a role in Cora's death, but Henry doesn't believe Snow White would hurt someone. Gold arrives to warn them that Regina plans to kill Mary Margaret, and David demands that Gold save her as repayment for Mary Margaret for saving his life.

A distraught Regina ransacks her mother's belongings until she finds the ingredients for a love spell for which the final ingredient is the heart of the person the caster hates most—Mary Margaret. Henry realizes Regina plans to use the curse on him. Regina tells Henry that he means too much to her for her to lose him; he asks her to prove it by not casting the curse. She insists that the imitation of love created by the curse will make them happy, but he refuses her offer, his response echoing Owen's in 1983. It is revealed that Greg is the adult Owen Flynn.

Reception

Ratings
The outing saw a slight increase in the ratings, placing 2.3/6 among 18-49s with 7.45 million viewers tuning in.

Reviews
The episode was met with positive reviews.

Oliver Sava of The A.V. Club gave this episode a "B+" and wrote, "After two strong episodes, it’s beginning to seem like Once Upon A Time is preparing to end the season on a high note, but things can fall apart at any instant. And that’s the big problem with shows as inconsistent as this one."

References

External links
 

2013 American television episodes
Once Upon a Time (season 2) episodes